Gender fluidity is a non-fixed gender identity that shifts over time or depending on the situation. These fluctuations can occur at the level of gender identity or gender expression. A genderfluid person may fluctuate among different gender expressions over their lifetime, or express multiple aspects of various gender markers at the same time. Genderfluid individuals may also identify as non-binary or transgender, but may also identify with their assigned gender.

Gender fluidity may be a transitionary phase, allowing people to explore gender before finding a more stable gender expression or identity. For others, gender fluidity may continue throughout life.

History 
The first known mention of the term gender fluidity was in Kate Bornstein's 1994 book Gender Outlaw: On Men, Women and the Rest of Us. It was used again in 1996 book The Second Coming: A Leatherdyke Reader.

On February 2014, Facebook launched "Gender Fluid" as one of the 50 identity options available.

On May 6, 2015, Dictionary.com added an entry for genderfluid.

Symbols 
The genderfluid pride flag was designed by JJ Poole in 2012. The pink stripe of the flag represents femininity, the white represents lack of gender, purple represents mixed gender or androgyny, black represents all other genders, and blue represents masculinity.

See also 

 Gender identity
 Gender questioning
 Non-binary
 Transgender

References

Further reading

Bibliography 

 

Gender identity
LGBT studies
Transgender
Transgender identities
Non-binary gender